The Ministry of Health and Medical Industry of Turkmenistan, is an agency of the Turkmenistan's government, headquartered in Ashgabat. As of 2013, Nurmuhammet Amannepesow is the minister.

List of ministers 
 Aksoltan Ataýewa (5 August 1992 – 9 March 1994)
 Gurbangeldy Kadamov (9 March 1994 – 21 July 1995)
 Chary Kulyýew (21 July 1995 – 15 December 1997)
 Gurbanguly Berdimuhamedow (15 December 1997 – 21 December 2006)
 Byashim Sopyev (21 December 2006 – 14 February 2007)
 Ata Serdarow (27 February 2007 – 9 April 2010)
 Gurbanmamed Ilyasov (9 April 2010 – 5 July 2013)
 Nurmuhammet Amannepesow (5 July 2013 – present)

External links
  
 

Health
Turkmenistan